Ursa Major Dwarf is a name for two dwarf spheroidal galaxies orbiting the Milky Way Galaxy.

 Ursa Major I Dwarf, also called UMa I dSph, was discovered in 2005.
 Ursa Major II Dwarf, also called UMa I| dSph, was discovered in 2006.

See also 
 Palomar 4, once thought to be a satellite galaxy, now known to be a globular cluster of the Milky Way

Ursa Major (constellation)